Nawt Vaya is a populated place situated on the San Xavier Indian Reservation in Pima County, Arizona, United States. Historically, it has also been known as Agua Lavaria, Agua la Vara, Agua la Varia, Alamo, and Not Vaya, before Nawt Vaya became the official name following a decision by the Board on Geographic Names in 1941. The name means pampas grass well in the O'odham language. In the early days of European settlement, a small spring lay nearby at Agua la Vara, from which travelers through the pass obtained water.

Notes

References

Populated places in Pima County, Arizona